The European Community Shipowners' Associations (ECSA) is the voice of the European shipping industry.

Founded in 1965 under the name Comité des Associations d'Armateurs des Communautés Européennes (CAACE), ECSA promotes the interests of 19 member associations of the EU and Norway. As a trade association, ECSA strives for a regulatory environment that fosters the international competitiveness of European shipping.

ECSA works through a permanent secretariat in Brussels, a Board of Directors and a number of specialised committees and working groups.

ECSA’s current President is Philippos Philis, its Vice-President is Karin Orsel.

The organisation is recognised by the European Institutions as the representative body of the European shipping sector, and is registered in the European Commission’s Transparency Register for Interest Representatives since 23 June 2008.

ECSA’s strategic priorities are:

 Climate and Sustainability
 Trade
 Competitiveness
 Internal Market
 Innovation & Digitalisation
 Human Resources
 Safety
 Legal Affairs
 Taxation
 Better Regulation

Member Associations 
(in alphabetical order)

 Belgium: Royal Belgian Shipowners' Association 
 Cyprus: Joint Cyprus Shipowners' Association
 Denmark: Danish Shipping 
 Estonia: Estonian Shipowners' Association
 Finland: Finnish Shipowners' Association
 France: Armateurs de France 
 Germany: Verband Deutscher Reeder 
 Greece: Union of Greek Shipowners 
 Ireland: Irish Chamber of Shipping 
 Italy: Confederazione Italiana Armatori 
 Lithuania: Lithuanian Shipowners
 Luxembourg: Fedilshipping 
 Malta: Malta International Shipping Council
 Netherlands: Koninklijke Vereniging van Nederlandse Reders 
 Norway: Norwegian Shipowners' Association 
 Portugal: Associacao de Armadores da Marinha de Comercio 
 Slovenia: Slovenian Association of Shipowners
 Spain: Asociacion de Navieros Espanoles 
 Sweden: Swedish Shipowners' Association 

Many ECSA members are also members of the International Chamber of Shipping (ICS).

The European shipping industry 
The European shipping industry controls 39.5% of the global merchant fleet. This amounts to 810 million deadweight tonnes or 550 million gross tonnes and 23,400 vessels.

Shipping is a valuable economic and geopolitical asset of the European Union. In 2018, it delivered €54 billion to the EU's GDP. This translates into €78,000 GDP per worker, compared to the EU average of €63,000. Its direct economic impact is significant, with 685,000 persons employed in both sea- and land-based jobs in the same year. Taking into consideration the indirect and induced impacts, the total economic impact of European shipping amounts to €149 billion and 2 million jobs. For every €1 million GDP the European shipping industry creates, another €1.8 million is supported elsewhere in the EU economy.

See also 
 International Chamber of Shipping 
 International Maritime Organization (the United Nations agency with responsibility for the safety of life at sea and the protection of the marine environment )
International Labour Organization 
 UNCTAD review of maritime transport (annual UNCTAD publication)
European Transport Workers' Federation

References

External links 
 Official website of ECSA
2020 Report of the ‘Economic Value of the EU Shipping Industry” by Oxford Economics

Professional associations based in Europe
International water transport
Shipping trade associations
Organizations established in 1965
Trade associations based in Belgium